Wenche Blomberg (born 23 June 1943 in Tønsberg) is a Norwegian author. She has worked as a journalist, librarian, criminologist and government scholar.

Blomberg has written many children's books, such as Appelsinenes land (1980), about the everyday life of children in Palestine from 1947–1948, the picture book Jeg skal få en katt (1983), Kiai! (1987) and the picture book Vesle Perlegrå (2004) with illustrations by Bo Gaustad. She has also written educational books and song books about the Middle East, including For døve ører (1990) and Karoline og vitenskapen (1993), both dealing with psychiatry, and Galskapens hus. Internering og utskilling i Norge 1550—1850 (2002), about the history of the psychiatric institution, and works a great deal on the institution's quarterly "Prinds Christian Augusts Minde" in Oslo.

She won the Kulturdepartementets bildebokpris in 1983, the NBU-prisen in 1992, and Norway's research council's interpretation prize in 2006.

Wenche Blomberg was born in Tønsberg and grew up in Tjøme, Vestfold. Blomberg is the leader of Bondeungdomslaget i Oslo, since 2007.

She has received a state grant since 2008.

External links
Bibliography
Prindsen

Norwegian children's writers
Norwegian librarians
Writers from Tønsberg
People from Tjøme
1943 births
Living people